The Island President is a 2011 documentary film about the efforts of then-President of the Maldives Mohamed Nasheed to tackle rising sea levels resulting from climate change. Produced by Actual Films, an Oscar- and Emmy-winning American documentary film company based in San Francisco, and directed by Jon Shenk, the film premiered at the Telluride Film Festival.

The government of the Maldives has predicted it would be inundated as a result of global warming since 1988, when its forecast was "completely cover this Indian Ocean nation of
1196 small islands with in the next 30 years;" i.e., by 2018.

The film was funded by groups including the Ford Foundation, the American Corporation for Public Broadcasting, the John D. and Catherine T. MacArthur Foundation, the Atlantic Philanthropies and the Sundance Institute.

At the 2011 Toronto International Film Festival, The Island President won the Cadillac People's Choice Documentary Award.

US rights to The Island President were acquired by Samuel Goldwyn Films. The film opened in New York City on March 28, 2012, followed by releases in other US cities, like Los Angeles and San Francisco.

After Nasheed stepped down as president in February 2012, Shenk said that he hoped his film could help convince the world that Nasheed was deposed in a coup that was orchestrated by loyalists to the former dictator, Maumoon Abdul Gayoom.  "That might be the single most important thing that the movie can do.  It’s now clear that this new government is not democratic, that the people who run the ministries are the same people who were there under the dictator."

Reception
The Island President received positive reviews from critics. On Rotten Tomatoes, the film has a fresh rating of 98%, based on 45 reviews, with the consensus saying, "An eye-opening and appealing documentary about an earnest politician up against the closed door drama of climate change." The film has a score of 72 out of 100 at Metacritic, based on 14 reviews. A.O. Scott of The New York Times described the film as "buoyant and spirited" despite a grim postscript, praising its "spectacular aerial and underwater footage of the Maldives’ beauty" and stating that "It is impossible, while watching it, to root against Mr. Nasheed or to believe that he will fail". Noel Murray of The A.V. Club gave the film a "B−", praising "the energy and conclusiveness" of its opening sections, but writing that "the movie stalls a bit" during the sections of international diplomacy.

See also 

 Climate change in the Maldives

References

External links

The Island President at the Movie Review Query Engine

Documentary films about global warming
Environment of the Maldives
Films set in the Maldives
Films shot in the Maldives
2011 films
2011 documentary films
Documentary films about politicians